Chennai Palani Mars is a 2019 Indian Tamil drama film co-written, co-produced and directed by Biju Viswanath. The film is also co-written and co-produced by Vijay Sethupathi under his own production house. It stars Praveen Raja and Rajesh Giriprasad in the lead roles, alongside a cast featuring predominantly newcomers.

The film narrates the story of a cocaine addict who sets off on a road trip with a fellow junkie to realise his dream of reaching Mars via Chennai and Palani, after pinning hopes on a scientifically unstable concept. Featuring music composed by Niranjan Babu, the film was released on 26 July 2019.

Cast

Production
The film was publicly announced after the shoot had been completed during May 2019. Described as a rural comedy with a space connection, the film was jointly produced and written by Biju Viswanath and Vijay Sethupathi, who had earlier worked together in Orange Mittai (2015). As the actors were all newcomers, Biju gave them an acting workshop and shot scenes in handycam first before embarking on the shoot.

Soundtrack
The film's soundtrack was composed by Niranjan Babu and lyrics written by Vignesh Jeyapal.
"Kanavil Kanda Paathai" – Rajesh Giriprasad
"Vaanam Keezha" – Rajesh Giriprasad
"Ithanai Neelam Vaanam" – Rajesh Giriprasad, Niranjan Babu
"Vaanam Sumanda Megham" – Sujay Iswarian Isaac DP
"Tholaiyaadha Ondrai" – Anila Rajeev
"Seesame" – Anila Rajeev
"Song of Universe" – Haritha

Release
The film won two international awards - the Best Narrative Platinum award at Pinnacle Film Awards, and Best Drama Grand Jury Gold award at the Los Angeles Film Festival.

The film had its theatrical release on July 26, 2019.
It was released in ZEE5 Indian video on demand website on May 7, 2020.

Baradwaj Rangan, national award-winning Indian film critic, praised the film for it unconventional approach, "If you can catch the film’s vibe, it’s a trip".

Pradeep Kumar from The Hindu wrote "Chennai palani Mars is a bold first attempt at experimental film-making".

The critic from The Indian Express stated "what started off on a promising note, turns into an uninspiring story, eventually", suggesting it was an "experiment gone awry". A reviewer from The New Indian Express wrote "Chennai Palani Mars, for all its faults, is one of the most outlandish films that has been written, shot and presented to the Tamil cinema audience in quite some time", adding it was an "outlandish travelogue that quickly runs out of fuel".

References

External links

2019 films
2010s Tamil-language films
2019 comedy-drama films
Indian black comedy films
Stoner films